The Door in the Wall is a short story by  H. G. Wells
 The Door in the Wall and Other Stories is a 1911 short story collection by H. G. Wells
 The Door in the Wall (novel) is a 1949 children's novel by Marguerite de Angeli
 The Door in the Wall is a 1965 collection of short stories by Oliver La Farge.